Tam Siu Wai (born 17 September 1970 in Hong Kong) is a former Hong Kong professional footballer.

Honours
Eastern
Hong Kong First Division League: 1992–93, 1993–94
Hong Kong Senior Shield: 1992–93, 1993–94
Hong Kong FA Cup: 1992–93, 1993–94
Rangers
Hong Kong Senior Shield: 1994–95
Hong Kong FA Cup: 1994–95
Instant-Dict
Hong Kong First Division League: 1997–98
Hong Kong FA Cup: 1996–97, 1997–98, 2000–01
Sun Hei
Hong Kong First Division League: 2003–04
Hong Kong League Cup: 2003–04
Kitchee
Hong Kong League Cup: 2005–06, 2006–07
Hong Kong Senior Shield: 2005–06

References

External links
Tam Siu Wai at HKFA
Profile at kitchee.com 

1970 births
Living people
Hong Kong footballers
Hong Kong international footballers
Association football midfielders
Eastern Sports Club footballers
Hong Kong Rangers FC players
Double Flower FA players
Sun Hei SC players
Kitchee SC players
Happy Valley AA players
Hong Kong First Division League players
Footballers at the 1990 Asian Games
Footballers at the 1994 Asian Games
Asian Games competitors for Hong Kong